A Killer Party: A Murder Mystery Musical  is a digital remotely performed musical created in 2020 during the COVID-19 pandemic. It began streaming as a 9-episode web series on Vimeo on August 5, 2020. Its creative team includes Jason Howland (Music), Nathan Tysen (Lyrics), Rachel Axler and Kait Kerrigan (Book), Marc Bruni (Direction), Bobby Pearce (Costume Design), Billy Jay Stein (Music Producer) and HMS Media (Video Post-Production).

The virtual musical was produced by Kevin Duda & Jason Howland.

On August 11, 2020, Music Theater International acquired the licensing rights to the musical.

Original  Cast

References

External links
 Official Site

2020 musicals
Impact of the COVID-19 pandemic on the performing arts
Cultural responses to the COVID-19 pandemic